Rodger L. Reedy (born ) is an American politician. He is a member of the Missouri House of Representatives from the 57th District, serving since 2019. He is a member of the Republican Party.

Missouri House of Representatives

Tenure 
Reedy proposed a bill to allow the Missouri Department of Natural Resources (DNR) to acquire the Antioch cemetery in west-central Missouri’s Clinton as a state park and a historically significant educational site. It is operated and maintained by DNR’s Division of State Parks. The bill was approved by the Missouri House 149-0, and later passed by the Missouri senate. The bill was signed into law by governor Mike Parson.

Electoral History

Personal life 
Reedy was born in Clinton and is a 1979 graduate of Lincoln High School in Lincoln, Missouri. He and his wife Rhonda have three grown children, Kayley, Austin and Wesley. They attend First Baptist Church in Clinton. Rhonda is a first grade teacher. In addition, she is also the co-owner of a gift shop in Clinton Square Historic District.

References

Living people
1960s births
Republican Party members of the Missouri House of Representatives
21st-century American politicians